WMST (1150 AM / 106.9 FM) is a radio station serving the Lexington-Fayette metropolitan area with an adult standards/soft AC format fed from Westwood One's Adult Standards satellite feed and is under ownership of Gateway Radio Works, Inc.

1150 AM is a Regional broadcast frequency.

Other programming includes newscasts, from CBS News and the Kentucky News Network, live talk (some are local) and religious programs, including the nationwide syndicated show, "The Sunday Morning Wake-up with Chris" from August 2003 until December 2008 and was produced in the studios of WMST. Local air talent, Chris Conkright, also won the Edward R. Murrow Award for WMST in 2009 for "Best Newscast" in Small Market Radio for his entry, "Gateway Regional News at Five."

On a clear day, WMST-AM can be heard as far away West as Louisville, KY, as far away East as Morehead, KY, as far away North as Florence, KY and as far away South as Monticello, KY. The most popular item on the current programming line-up includes the locally produced show, "Mornings on Main" which can be heard weekday mornings from 8:20am until 10:30am. WMST airs five major newscasts ("Gateway Regional News") every weekday (6:00am, 7:00am, 8:00am, 12:00pm, 5:00pm).

Translators
In addition to the main station, WMST-AM is relayed by an additional stereo translator to widen its broadcast area.

External links
WMST 1150 AM - Official Website

MST
Adult standards radio stations in the United States
Soft adult contemporary radio stations in the United States
Radio stations established in 1950
1950 establishments in Kentucky
Mount Sterling, Kentucky